The Shelburne Police Service (SPS) was the police force for the Town of Shelburne, Ontario, Canada. It was established in 1879 and consisted of 23 members, including 15 police officers, 4 auxiliary police officers, 2 civilian support members.  These members provided emergency responses to approximately 8500 residents, responding to more than 4000 calls per year.

Members worked out of Shelburne Town Hall located at 203 Main Street, East in Shelburne, Ontario.

After 141 years of service the Shelburne Police Department was replaced by the Ontario Provincial Police (O.P.P.), a decision that had been weighing over the town for some time.

https://barrie.ctvnews.ca/mobile/after-141-years-of-service-the-shelburne-police-department-will-be-replaced-1.5027118

Town council decided to make the change to the OPP after two separate cost estimates.

In February 2021, the shift to the OPP took place, with staffing based out of the O.P.P Primrose Detachment.

The shift to the OPP will take place February 2021 in the town of Shelburne and staffing will be based out of the O.P.P. Primrose Detachment.

Specialization

The Shelburne Police Service  had frontline members trained in the following areas:
 Qualified breath technician
 Community services Drug Abuse Resistance Education
 Bike patrol
 Ontario Sexual Assault Registry
 Freedom of information
 Scenes of crime (SOCO) 
 Criminal Intelligence Service of Ontario (CISO)
 Domestic violence
 Media relations
 Major case management
 Violent crime linkage analysis system (ViCLAS)
 VITRA

Community events
The Shelburne Police Service was a proud partner with the Special Olympics and actively participated in fundraising through the Law Enforcement Torch Run.  Since 2011, the Shelburne Police Service had raised more than $105,000 for Special Olympics Ontario.  This included the annual Law Enforcement Torch Run, and as of 2018, the Polar Plunge for Special Olympics.

The Shelburne Police Service also participated actively in the annual Stuff A Cruiser, where items (clothing, toys, funds) collected during the holiday season are donated to the Salvation Army and Dufferin Child and Family Services.

Command

The chief of police was the highest-ranking officer. The position belonged to Kent Moore, who was appointed in 2005.
The Shelburne Police had two Sergeants: Mark Bennett and Paul Neumann.

Police services board 
The police services board was composed of three appointees, in addition to Chief Moore.  On the current police services board are:
 Chairman  Len Mikulich
 Provincial Appointee Sandra Lawrence
 Shelburne Mayor Wade Mills

Shelburne Police Services Board meetings

Location: police board room, Shelburne Police Service every third Tuesday of the month.

Special investigations unit

The actions of the Shelburne Police were examined by the special investigations unit, a civilian agency responsible for investigating circumstances involving police and civilians that have resulted in a death, serious injury, or allegations of sexual assault.

References
 Shelburne Police Service 2017 Annual Report
 Shelburne Police Service 2017-2019 Business Report
 Shelburne Police Service 2016 Community Survey

External links
 Shelburne Police Service Official web site

 https://barrie.ctvnews.ca/mobile/after-141-years-of-service-the-shelburne-police-department-will-be-replaced-1.5027118

Law enforcement agencies of Ontario